The Laconian Gulf, is a gulf in the south-eastern Peloponnese, in Greece.  It is the southernmost gulf in Greece and the largest in the Peloponnese. 

In the shape of an inverted "U", it is approximately 58 km wide east-west, and 44 km long north-south.  It is bounded to the west by the Mani peninsula, which separates it from the Messenian Gulf, and to the east by the Cape Maleas peninsula (also known as the Epidavros Limira peninsula), which separates it from the Aegean Sea.  To the south it opens onto the Mediterranean Sea.  The Mani and Cape Maleas peninsulas are dry and rocky, but the northern shore, fed by the Evrotas River, which empties into the gulf at its apex, is fertile farmland.  The island of Elafonissos lies in the Laconian Gulf, with the island of Kythira directly to the south.  The main ports and settlements on the gulf are Gytheio and Neapolis.

Gulfs of Greece
Landforms of Laconia
Gulfs of the Mediterranean
Landforms of Peloponnese (region)